Esakiozephyrus icana, the dull green hairstreak, is a small butterfly found in India that belongs to the lycaenids or blues (family Lycaenidae). The species was first described by Frederic Moore in 1874.

The butterfly was classified as Thecla icana Moore.

The butterfly occurs in India in the western Himalayas from Kulu to Garhwal, Nepal, Sikkim to Bhutan and Myanmar. The butterfly also occurs in Tibet, Szechwan and Yunnan.

See also
Lycaenidae
List of butterflies of India (Lycaenidae)

References

Esakiozephyrus
Butterflies of Asia